Imed Ketata is a Tunisian football player that plays defense.
He formerly played for the Océano Club de Kerkennah, the Club Sportif Sfaxien, and the AS Djerba .

Awards 
Winner of the 2003 Tunisian League Cup

References

External links
Profile at Tunisie-foot.com

Living people
Tunisian footballers
Océano Club de Kerkennah players
CS Sfaxien players
AS Djerba players
Association footballers not categorized by position
Year of birth missing (living people)